Polaris Dawn is a planned private human spaceflight mission, operated by SpaceX on behalf of Shift4 Payments CEO Jared Isaacman, scheduled to launch no earlier than July 2023. The flight will be using the Crew Dragon capsule, and is the first of three planned missions in a program named the Polaris program. It is planned to be the eleventh crewed flight overall of the Crew Dragon.

Crew

Mission 
Polaris Dawn will be a human spaceflight to orbit Earth with only private citizens on board. The crew will consist of Jared Isaacman, Scott Poteet, Sarah Gillis, and Anna Menon, who will spend up to five days in orbit. Mission plans include reaching an orbit higher than any previous Dragon mission and ultimately the highest Earth orbit ever flown by a crewed spacecraft with an initial apogee of 1,400 km, breaking the record set by Gemini 11. The crew will conduct 38 science and research experiments to study the effects of spaceflight and space radiation on human health. The crew will also attempt the first commercial extravehicular activity (EVA) with SpaceX-designed EVA spacesuits. The mission will also be the first test of Starlink's communications laser for communication with another spacecraft, potentially improving connection with the spacecraft.

See also 

 Inspiration4
 Polaris program

References

External links 
 Polaris Dawn

Future human spaceflights
2023 in the United States
2023 in spaceflight
SpaceX Dragon 2
SpaceX human spaceflights
Fully civilian crewed orbital spaceflights